The Hooked Generation is a 1968 American crime drama film directed by William Grefé and starring Jeremy Slate, Steve Alaimo and John Davis Chandler.

Plot

Cast
 Jeremy Slate as Daisey 
 Steve Alaimo as Mark 
 John Davis Chandler as Acid 
 Willie Pastrano as Dum Dum 
 Socrates Ballis as Cuban Leader 
 Cece Stone as Kelly 
 Walter R. Philbin as Lieutenant Dern 
 Milton Smith as Book Everett 
 Lee Warren as Charlie 
 William Kerwin as FBI Man #1 
 Dete Parsons as FBI Man #2 
 Stuart Merrill as FBI Man #3 
 Marilyn Nordman as Book's Girlfriend 
 Curtis Perdue as Coast Guard Lieutenant 
 Michael DeBeausset as Rapper 
 Gay Perkins as Nivar 
 Terry Smith as Talla 
 Clinton Nye as Young Coastguardman 
 Emil Deaton as Coastguardman

References

Bibliography
 Randall Clark. At a Theater or Drive-in Near You: The History, Culture, and Politics of the American Exploitation Film. Routledge, 2013.

External links
 

1968 films
1968 crime films
1960s English-language films
American crime films
Films directed by William Grefe
Allied Artists films
1960s American films